The Cabinet of Émile Eddé headed by Émile Eddé was formed on 12 October 1929 and served until 20 March 1930.

Composition

References 

Cabinets of Lebanon